is a 2006 Japanese animated film directed by Yusuke Yamamoto and written by Mamiko Ikeda. It is the first movie in the Sgt. Frog series created by Mine Yoshizaki.

Plot
Keroro skips out on destroying military planes in a simulated reality in favor of buying the newest Gundam model with Fuyuki. As they head home, they encounter a mystery shrine resembling a space fort. As Keroro prepares to give a monetary offering, he accidentally drops a 100-yen coin into the shrine, forcing him and Fuyuki to go after it. Inside the shrine is a prehistoric-looking jungle, where Fuyuki finds an ancient dome and a small glass container, inside it a glowing orb. As Keroro triumphantly finds his coin, he knocks over the container, which breaks, causing the orb to shine wildly. After Keroro attempts to fix the container with rubber cement, the duo dashes out of the shrine and toward home, leaving the remaining piece of the container to transform into a pink

As Keroro builds his new GM Sniper Custom model, he discovers a small red X on his face. He goes to both Fuyuki and Natsumi to tell them about his dilemma, but neither of them are of any help. That night, a menacing white Keronian appears from the mystery shrine, and gives numerous Earthlings the same red X. The next day, it is discovered that anyone who possesses this red mark gains telepathic powers named "Revocommi", allowing them to communicate with their minds. The X mark is also contagious: it can be spread from one person to another, allowing other people to become Revolutor. Keroro then orders Kururu to create an amplifying device, planning to use his new power to send amplified orders to the Revolutor of Earth, putting them under his control. That night, the white Keronian (who has taken residence on a tower) sends out a strange signal.

The next day, everyone has become depressed, this is because the Revolutor can sense each other's malicious thoughts, they're avoiding others, and begin to withdraw from society. What's more, because of telepathy, there's no need for cops, TV broadcasts, Internet, or cell phones, and the entire city shuts down. That night, strange green orbs emerge from the Revolutor's marks, and are fed to the white Keronian. On the same night, as Keroro's order-magnifying helmet is completed, the pink Keronian arrives in a gigantic Keronian statue. The Keronian introduces herself as Mirara, the Keron Army's ancient weapon researcher. She is fascinated by Keroro's helmet, but is frightened to see the X symbol on everyone, and tells them a story: The red X is a part of the Keronian weapon named Kiruru, which was sealed away in a vase by the Keron Army. It grows and multiplies from people's conflicts, pain, worries, and negative mental energy, after which it destroys the planet. The only thing that can reseal Kiruru is strong friendship and a heart of trust, but when Mirara reminds the group that invaders and invadees are sworn enemies, more negative energy is produced and Kiruru grows stronger. She turns to Momoka and Tamama for help, but only ends up causing the same problem.

Having absorbed everyone's malicious thoughts, Kiruru transforms into a monster and rampages through the city. The Keroro Platoon decides to take matters into their own hands and send Giroro and Tamama to attack Kiruru, but even their most powerful attacks fail to put a scratch on Kiruru. Seeing no other alternative, Keroro dons the helmet, intending to enlarge himself and send orders to Kiruru. But when that fails, he decides to stall Kiruru while Fuyuki, Natsumi, and Giroro head for the mystery shrine and figure out a way to stop Kiruru. Back at the mystery shrine, Fuyuki and Natsumi discover that it was Kiruru that destroyed the dinosaurs, and when Kiruru absorbs enough dark emotions, he starts multiplying, and only Mirara can stop Kiruru.

Keroro finally admits defeat to Kiruru, who then absorbs his energy, transforming into a large tower. Keroro returns to see the Hinata household (and all of his Gunpla) in ruins. The good memories Keroro and Fuyuki share together cause the red X on their heads to disappear. Mirara appears and gives the group red circles, after which she transforms into a key, which will seal Kiruru if it is inserted into the gigantic X on the tower. Using Mirara's Keronian statue as a mode of transportation, Keroro and Fuyuki are close to approaching the tower, but as soon as they come into close proximity, Kiruru starts to clone himself and chases after them. The statue crash lands, leaving the others to take care of the situation. Keroro and Fuyuki find a new mode of transportation in the form of Mutsumi's giant paper airplane, but the Kirurus continue to multiply. After the key continuously switches between owners, Kululu finally tosses it towards the X, which is shielded by a barrier. The barrier is broken when Giroro flies his mech into it. Natsumi and Giroro hold off the Kirurus while Fuyuki and Keroro go inside the tower. After a long stairway, the duo find a gigantic glass vase with a key-shaped slot. They finally seal away Kiruru, and the Kiruru Tower disappears in a brilliant yellow light, along with everyone's red X.

Voice cast

Video game adaptation

 is a party game based on the movie developed by Aspect and published by Bandai in 2006 and only in Japan.

Mini-games

Mini-games that support the multiplayer mode are marked with * (multi-card play and download play) and ** (multi-card play only).

The player must collect 20 coins while avoid the obstacles to not be run over by a steamroller.

Playable characters: Keroro, Tamama, Giroro, Kururu and Dororo

The player must reach the top of the levels before the time runs out.

Playable characters: Keroro, Tamama, Giroro, Kururu and Dororo

The player must slide the parts of the wanted character until it is complete. After that, the player have to touch it. It must be done before the time runs out.

Playable character: Keroro

The player must reach the goal before the time runs out.

Playable characters: Keroro, Tamama, Giroro, Kururu and Dororo

The player must fish until get required weight before the time runs out.

Playable characters: Tamama (as the fishman), Keroro and Giroro (as the baits)

It plays like Time Crisis.

Playable character: Giroro

Kururu must defend the Hinata family's house before it becomes destroyed.

Playable character: Kururu

It plays like Tag Team Match: MUSCLE, but better.

Playable characters: Keroro (Special move: Keroro Driver), Tamama (Special move: Tamama Impact), Giroro (Special move: Bull Docking) and Dororo (Special move: Dororo Slash)

Keroro must reach the goal before the time runs out by using a mecha robot. It walks continuously and the players must touch the buttons of a "Family Fun Fitness" like carpet on the bottom screen to run faster and to avoid the obstacles.

Playable character: Keroro

The player must find the wanted character before the time runs out. In harder levels, they will do more poses.

Playable character: Keroro

The last minigame is a battle of Keroro Shoutai against Kiruru. It can only be unlockable after the player beat the level 3 of all minigames.

Playable characters: Keroro, Tamama, Giroro, Kururu and Dororo

Reception
Famicom Tsūshin scored the game a 26 out of 40.

References

External links
 
 
 http://www.bandaigames.channel.or.jp/list/ds_keroro/ Official video game website (Japanese)

2006 anime films
Films set in Tokyo
Films set in Asia
Films set in Japan
Sgt. Frog films
Sunrise (company)
2006 video games
Bandai games
Japan-exclusive video games
Nintendo DS games
Nintendo DS-only games
Video games developed in Japan